Alexander Gerard FRSE (1728 –1795) was a Scottish minister, academic and philosophical writer. In 1764 he was the Moderator of the General Assembly of the Church of Scotland.

Life

He was born on 22 February 1728, the son of Gilbert Gerard (died 1738), at the manse in Garioch in Aberdeenshire. He attended Foveran Parish School then Aberdeen Grammar School.

He went to the University of Aberdeen, graduating with an MA in 1744. He then went to the University of Edinburgh to study divinity. He was licensed to preach in 1748.

In 1750 he returned to the University of Aberdeen to lecture in moral philosophy, becoming a professor in 1752, based at Marischal College. 

From 1760 to 1769 he was minister of Greyfriars Church in Aberdeen and in 1769 was elected Professor of Divinity at Marischal College, moving in 1771 to King's College. As a professor he introduced various reforms. During this time he was also one of the ministers of the city, serving at Greyfriars Church. He was a member of the Aberdeen Philosophical Society, founded by John Gregory and including members such as Prof Thomas Gordon.

In 1783 he was a joint founder of the Royal Society of Edinburgh.

He died on 22 January 1795. He is buried in the churchyard of St Machar's Cathedral in Old Aberdeen. The grave lies near the south east corner of the eastern cathedral enclosure.

Publications

In 1756 he gained the prize for an Essay on Taste which, together with an Essay on Genius, he subsequently published. These treatises, though now superseded, gained for him considerable reputation.
Compendious View of the Evidences of Natural and Revealed Religion the joint work by Alexander Gerard and his son Gilbert Gerard, published 1828.
A Plan of Education in Marischal College

Family

In June 1757 he married Jane Wight daughter of Dr John Wight of Colnae. They had several children:

Gilbert Gerard was his son.

References

References
Lee, Sidney (1903), Dictionary of National Biography Index and Epitome

Attribution

1728 births
1795 deaths
Scottish philosophers
People of the Scottish Enlightenment
Alumni of the University of Aberdeen
Academics of the University of Aberdeen
18th-century Ministers of the Church of Scotland
Moderators of the General Assembly of the Church of Scotland
Scottish essayists
Enlightenment philosophers
Founder Fellows of the Royal Society of Edinburgh
People from Aberdeenshire
People educated at Aberdeen Grammar School
Alumni of the University of Edinburgh